Taranis spirulata is a species of sea snail, a marine gastropod mollusk in the family Raphitomidae.

Description
The length of the shell attains 5.5 mm, its diameter 2.2 mm.

Distribution
This marine species is endemic to New Zealand and occurs off Taiaroa Heads, eastern Otago, at a depth of 550 metres

References

 Dell R.K. 1962 Additional archibenthal Mollusca from New Zealand. Records of the Dominion Museum, 4 (6) : 67-76.
 Powell, A.W.B. 1979 New Zealand Mollusca: Marine, Land and Freshwater Shells, Collins, Auckland
 Spencer, H.G., Marshall, B.A. & Willan, R.C. (2009). Checklist of New Zealand living Mollusca. Pp 196-219. in: Gordon, D.P. (ed.) New Zealand inventory of biodiversity. Volume one. Kingdom Animalia: Radiata, Lophotrochozoa, Deuterostomia. Canterbury University Press, Christchurch

External links
 
 Powell, A. W. B. The family Turridae in the Indo-Pacific. Part 1a. The subfamily Turrinae concluded, Indo-Pacific mollusca. vol. 1, 1964
 Spencer H.G., Willan R.C., Marshall B.A. & Murray T.J. (2011). Checklist of the Recent Mollusca Recorded from the New Zealand Exclusive Economic Zone

spirulata
Gastropods described in 1962
Gastropods of New Zealand